The women's 500 metres in short track speed skating at the 2006 Winter Olympics began on 12 February, with the final on 15 February, at the Torino Palavela.

Records
Prior to this competition, the existing world and Olympic records were as follows:

No new world and Olympic records were set during this competition.

Results

Heats
The first round was held on 12 February. There were eight heats of three or four skaters each, with the top two finishers moving on to the quarterfinals.

Heat 1

Quarterfinals
The top two finishers in each of the four quarterfinals advanced to the semifinals. In quarterfinal #2, Sarah Lindsay of Great Britain was advanced after she was impeded during the race.

Quarterfinal 1

Quarterfinal 2

Quarterfinal 3

Quarterfinal 4

Semifinals
The top two finishers in each of the two semifinals qualified for the A final, while the third and fourth place skaters advanced to the B Final. The fifth place finisher in semifinal #1, Sarah Lindsay, did not advance.

Semifinal 1

Semifinal 2

Finals
Fu Tianyu originally placed third in final A, but was disqualified, moving Anouk Leblanc-Boucher up to third, and the Final B winner, Kalyna Roberge, to fourth.

On 16 February, Canada filed a protest with the Court of Arbitration for Sport over the results of the Final A, but it was dismissed. Evgenia Radanova of Bulgaria, who won the silver, crossed the finish line with part of one of her skates in the air, which is against the rules. This protest would have moved the winner of the B Final, Kalyna Roberge, to the bronze medal place, a bronze medal winner Anouk Leblanc-Boucher up to silver. The CAS ultimately dismissed this appeal, and the results stood.

Final A

Final B

References

Women's short track speed skating at the 2006 Winter Olympics